Tokyo Rose is a 1946 American drama film produced by Pine-Thomas Productions, directed by Lew Landers and starring Byron Barr, Osa Massen, Donald Douglas, Richard Loo, Keye Luke and Grace Lem. It was released on February 8, 1946, by Paramount Pictures.

Plot

Cast 
Byron Barr as Pete Sherman
Osa Massen as Greta Norburg
Donald Douglas as Timothy O'Brien
Richard Loo as Colonel Suzuki
Keye Luke as Charlie Otani
Grace Lem as Soon Hee

References

External links 
 
Review of film at Variety

1946 films
American thriller drama films
Paramount Pictures films
1940s thriller drama films
American black-and-white films
1946 drama films
Films set in Tokyo
Japan in non-Japanese culture
1940s English-language films
Films directed by Lew Landers
1940s American films